Garrett Nugent (1822-1898)  was an Irish Anglican priest.

Nugent was educated at Trinity College, Dublin. and ordained in 1849. After a curacy at Clontibret he was an SPG missionary in Vaughan, Ontario from 1851 until 1862. He then held incumbencies at  Ardnurcher and Balrathboyne. He was Archdeacon of Meath from 1882 until his death on 7 March 1898.

Notes

1898 deaths
Church of Ireland priests
Irish Anglican missionaries
1822 births
Archdeacons of Meath
Alumni of Trinity College Dublin
19th-century Irish Anglican priests